Ruperto Reeves (born 12 February 1934) is an Ecuadorian footballer. He played in two matches for the Ecuador national football team in 1963. He was also part of Ecuador's squad for the 1963 South American Championship.

References

1934 births
Living people
Ecuadorian footballers
Ecuador international footballers
Association football midfielders
Barcelona S.C. footballers
People from Santa Elena Province